The Sinclair School of Nursing is a nursing school affiliated with the University of Missouri and University of Missouri Health Care. First established in 1920, the program is fully accredited by the Commission on Collegiate Nursing Education. In 2014, CollegeAtlas.org ranked it as the top school of nursing in the nation.

Academics
The School has over 380 undergraduate students enrolled in the Bachelor of Science in Nursing (BSN) program and over 200 graduate students in their Master of Science in Nursing (MSN) and Doctor of Nursing Practice (DNP) programs.

The MU Sinclair School of Nursing maintains an eight-bed technology laboratory for students. Students may sign out equipment for use with clients as part of class assignments. The laboratory is staffed by skilled, experienced professional nurses who can offer suggestions for learning activities.

Institutions affiliated with the Sinclair School of Nursing include: Tiger Place, a retirement home that is a joint venture between the School of Nursing and Americare Senior Living; MU Sinclair Home Care, a home care arm of the School that was purchased in 2009 by Oxfard Healthcare; and the MU Interdisciplinary Center on Aging, which combines all three health science schools in an effort to enhance the quality of health care for older adults.

References

External links
 

University of Missouri
Nursing schools in Missouri
Educational institutions established in 1920
University subdivisions in Missouri
1920 establishments in Missouri